The Lieutenant of the Admiralty is a now honorary office generally held by a senior retired Royal Navy admiral. He is the official deputy to the Vice-Admiral of the United Kingdom. He is appointed by the Sovereign on the nomination of the First Sea Lord.

History
The Lieutenant of the Admiralty (or Lieutenant-Admiral) is first found in about the middle of the 15th century, as the Deputy or Assistant to the Lord High Admiral of England. In 1545 the Lieutenant of the Admiralty presided over the Council of the Marine. In 1546, when the Navy Board was formed, the Lieutenant of the Admiralty was appointed as its Head, but this ceased in 1564 when the Treasurer of the Navy became the Head of the Board. The post was revived in 1604 when it appears to have been given as a mark of honourable distinction - with a salary of -£100p.a., including two clerks and certain travelling expenses. In 1672 the post of Lieutenant of the Admiralty was merged into that of Vice-Admiral of England until 1707. The title became part of the office of the Vice-Admiral of Great Britain until 1800. From 1801 the office was joined with that of Vice-Admiral of the United Kingdom, and was the second most powerful position in the Royal Navy.

List of lieutenants of the admiralty
Note: Incomplete list
 Sir Thomas Clere April 1546 - December 1552 
 Sir William Woodhouse, December 1552 - 1564 
Post in abeyance
 Sir Richard Leveson, April 1604 - July 1605 
Post in abeyance
 Sir Robert Mansell July 1605 - June 1656 - (appointed for life died in office)
Post in abeyance
 Edward Montagu, 1st Earl of Sandwich, 1661-1663 
 Henry FitzRoy, Duke of Grafton, 1663-1672 

Office is merged with Vice Admiral of England in 1672.

References

Sources
  Rodger, N.A.M. (1979). The Admiralty. Offices of State. Terence Dalton Ltd, Lavenham. Suffolk. England.

External links

16th-century Royal Navy personnel
L
Maritime history of the United Kingdom